The 2022 Slough Borough Council election took place on 5 May 2022 to elect members of Slough Borough Council in England. This was on the same day as other local elections.

Results summary

Ward results

Baylis and Stoke

Britwell and Northborough

Central

Chalvey

Cippenham Green

Cippenham Meadows

Colnbook with Poyle

Farnham

Elliman

Haymill and Lynch Hill

Langley Kedermister

Langley St. Mary's

Upton

Wexham Lea

References

2022
Slough